Martha Caroline Theresa Lorber (June 11, 1900 – July 2, 1983) was an American dancer, actress, singer, model, and Ziegfeld Girl.

Early life 
Martha Caroline Theresa Lorber was born in New York City, to Frederick, a waiter, and Marie Lorber (née Westfeldt), who were both German immigrants. She graduated from Girls' High School in Brooklyn. She studied dance with Alexis Kosloff, Ekaterina Galanta, and Michel Fokine.

Career 

Martha Lorber's Broadway career began when she was still in her teens, and included roles in Over the Top (1917–1918), Mecca (1920–1921), Tangerine (1922), Ziegfeld Follies of 1922, Ziegfeld Follies of 1923, Ziegfeld Follies of 1924, Mozart (1926), and Three Little Girls (1930). In the Ziegfeld Follies she played opposite W. C. Fields in some sketches, showing some comedic talent. She played a lead role in Ferenc Molnár's The Play's the Thing, in Baltimore in 1928. In 1929, she was in London, playing in Little Accident.

In 1930 she broke away from musicals with a dramatic part in the Zoe Akins drama The Greeks Had a Name for It. She starred in another drama the following year, Torch Song (1931), in Canada. In 1933, she was featured in two roles in another musical, The Red Robin, in Chicago. In 1934 she was in True to the Marines in Locust Valley.

In 1941, she toured in a one-woman show, Songs in Action. In 1951, she was hired by the U. S. State Department for a cultural relations position.

Lorber was also a model, posing for works by photographers Edward Steichen, Nickolas Muray, and Arnold Genthe, pin-up artist Alberto Vargas, and sculptor Harriet Whitney Frishmuth, among others.

Personal life 
Martha Lorber died at her home in Lebanon Township, New Jersey, in 1983, aged 83 years.

References

External links 

 
 Photographs of Martha Lorber at Getty Images.

1900 births
1983 deaths
American dancers
American actresses
People from Brooklyn
20th-century American women